Jess Eva is an Australian radio host, television personality and author known for her appearances on reality television and for co-hosting a breakfast radio show in Sydney.

Early life
Eva grew up with no electricity until she was about eighteen, “People say it’s a bit unusual, but I grew up with it so for me it’s normal”, she explained on I’m A Celebrity…Get Me Out Of Here! in 2021. She was a lawn bowls player from a young age and eventually became a lawn bowls champion.

Career
Eva appeared as a contestant on the fourteenth season of The Block in 2018 alongside her partner Norm Hogan.

Eva co-hosted the Triple M breakfast show in Sydney alongside Mark "MG" Geyer and Chris Page from 2019 to Nov 2022.

In 2021, she appeared as a contestant on the seventh season of I’m A Celebrity…Get Me Out Of Here!. She finished in third place. Also in 2021, Eva released her first book, “Why Wouldn’t Ya”.

Eva appeared as a recurring presenter on the morning talk show Studio 10. In November 2022, Sarah Harris announced her departure from the show and Eva was brought in as a temporary co-host alongside Tristan MacManus until the end of 2022. It is not yet confirmed who will permanently replace Harris in 2023.

Personal life
Eva has two children with her partner Norm Hogan. While appearing on I’m A Celebrity…Get Me Out Of Here! Australia in 2021, she opened up to Abbie Chatfield about how she suffered from  postnatal depression for twelve months after the birth of her son.

Television appearances

 The Block (2018)
 I’m A Celebrity…Get Me Out Of Here! Australia (2021)
 Studio 10 (2022-)

References

Living people
Year of birth missing (living people)
Australian radio presenters
Australian women radio presenters
I'm a Celebrity...Get Me Out of Here! (Australian TV series) participants